Kryukov and Kryukova (feminine) is a common Russian surname derived from the word "" (kryuk). While the literal meaning of the word is "hook", the surname stems from the figurative meaning of "finicky person", a "quibbler", but also a "stoop-shouldered person".

People with this surname include:
Andrei Krukov (born 1971), Kazakh and Azerbaijani skater
Artem Kryukov (born 1982), Russian ice hockey player
Fyodor Kryukov (1870–1920), Russian writer and soldier
Irina Kryukova (born 1968), Russian women chess grandmaster
Mikhail Kryukov (born 1932), Soviet and Russian anthropologist and historian
 Nikolai Kryukov (gymnast) (born 1978), Russian artistic gymnast
 Nikolai Kryukov (actor) (1915–1993), Soviet film and theater actor
 Nikolai Kryukov (composer) (1908–1961), Russian composer
 Vladimir Kryukov (rower) (born 1925), Russian rower
 Vladimir Kryukov (general) (1897–1959), Soviet Army general
Yevgeni Kryukov (born 1963), Soviet and Russian footballer and coach

See also
32734 Kryukov
Kryuchkov
Kryukov, name of several rural localities in Russia

References

Russian-language surnames